Buzz is the sixth album by bassist Ben Allison. It was released on the Palmetto Records label in 2004.

Track listing
All compositions by Ben Allison, except where noted.
 "Respiration"
 "Buzz"
 "Green Al"
 "Mauritania" (Michael Blake)
 "Erato" (Andrew Hill)
 "R&B Fantasy"
 "Across the Universe" (John Lennon)

Personnel
 Ben Allison – Bass, Guitar
 Michael Blake – Saxophones
 Ted Nash – Saxophone, Flute
 Clark Gayton – Trombone
 Frank Kimbrough – Piano, Wurlitzer
 Mike Sarin – Drums

References

External links
 benallison.com - Buzz

2004 albums
Ben Allison albums
Palmetto Records albums